Salah Montaser (‎; 6 August 1933 – 15 May 2022) was an Egyptian writer and journalist for Al-Ahram newspaper, and the owner of a daily column entitled ‘Just an Opinion.’ Among the most famous columns is ‘You Are the Master of Your Decision’ assessed for high school, which calls for smoking cessation. He adopted a campaign against smoking and he focused on that in his daily column every February, coinciding with the World Anti-Smoking Day. He was also a member of the Shura Council, a member of the Supreme Council of the Press in Egypt, and Chairman of the Board of Directors of the Arab Media Center. Montaser was born and raised in Damietta, Egypt. He joined the Faculty of Law and became a friend of the late Egyptian writer Abdel Wahab Mutawa. Montaser then worked with the great professor Hassanein Heikal as a journalist at Al-Ahram Foundation until he reached the highest levels of journalism, then began writing his prominent column ‘Just An Opinion’, which he became famous for during the past years. In addition, Montaser was a member of the Rotary Club, editor-in-chief of October magazine, and chairman of the board of directors of Dar Al Maaref for printing and publishing.

Works 
His works include the following:
Tawfiq Al-Hakim in his last testimony, Al-Ahram Center for Translation and Publishing, 1996
The People Sit on The Throne, General Book Authority, 1997
Speech in Lost Time, The Family Library, 1999
Those Who Changed the Twentieth Century, Al-Ahram Center for Translation and Publishing, 2000. 
From Orabi to Abdel Nasser: A New Reading of History, Dar Al-Shorouk, 2005
Tales of Days, Egyptian General Book Authority, 2008
Omar's Stories
Mubarak from Ascending to the Top to Falling to the Abyss
Good Morning Country, Egyptian General Book Authority, 2010
My Journey to the End of the World, Al-Ahram Center for Translation and Publishing, 2011
Rise and Fall from Podium to Court, Al-Masry Foundation for Press, Printing, Publishing, Advertising and Distribution, 2011

References 

1933 births
2022 deaths
Egyptian journalists
Egyptian male writers
Egyptian non-fiction writers
21st-century Egyptian writers
Male non-fiction writers
People from Damietta